The Alcohol and Gaming Commission of Ontario (AGCO) is an Ontario Crown agency that reports to the Ministry of the Attorney General. The AGCO is responsible for regulating the liquor, gaming, cannabis and horse racing sectors in accordance with the principles of honesty and integrity, and in the public interest.

Responsibilities
The responsibilities of the AGCO include the administration of the:
Liquor Licence and Control Act, 2019
Gaming Control Act, 1992
Horse Racing Licence Act, 2015
Cannabis Licence Act, 2018 (Ontario)

The AGCO also administers sections of the:
Charity Lottery Licensing Order-in-Council 1413/08

History
The Ontario Racing Commission was established in 1950 to oversee horse racing and on and off-track betting in Ontario. It was merged into the AGCO in 1998.

The AGCO was established on February 23, 1998, by the Government of Ontario under the Alcohol and Gaming Regulation and Public Protection Act of 1996. This Act transferred responsibility for the Liquor Licence Act and the Gaming Control Act to the AGCO. As a result of the establishment of the AGCO, the Government of Ontario passed complementary legislation to extinguish the Liquor Licence Board of Ontario, the Racing Commission of Ontario, and the Gaming Control Commission.

On April 1, 2016, the AGCO assumed responsibility for regulating horse racing under the Horse Racing Licence Act, 2015.

On October 17, 2018 the AGCO assumed responsibility for regulating private cannabis retail stores under the Cannabis Licence Act, 2018.

On April 4 2022, the AGCO updated restrictions on gambling promotions through which the iGaming companies draw newbies. Since that time lucrative bonus codes, signup deposits and free spins will be available for the gamers from Ontario only directly on the websites of the casinos and betting platforms.

Mandate
The mandate of the AGCO is to regulate the liquor, cannabis, gaming and horse racing sectors in accordance with the principles of honesty and integrity, and in the public interest.

References

External links
Alcohol and Gaming Commission of Ontario website

Canadian provincial alcohol departments and agencies
Alcohol in Ontario
Ontario government departments and agencies